The 56th Academy of Country Music Awards were held on April 18, 2021 in Nashville, Tennessee and broadcast from various locations around Nashville. The evening was co-hosted by Keith Urban and Mickey Guyton. Maren Morris and Chris Stapleton received the most nominations (six each), including one for Morris as a member of the Highwomen. Morris led the night with three wins, including one trophy for Female Artist of the Year and two trophies for Song of the Year, "The Bones," as both the artist and as the songwriter.  The ceremony involved no ticketed audience due to the ongoing COVID-19 pandemic, but featured a limited number of health care workers.

Background 
On March 11, 2021, CBS announced that the ceremony would be co-hosted by Keith Urban and Mickey Guyton. With her involvement, Guyton became the first African-American female, and second African-American overall, to host the ceremony, after Charley Pride, who co-hosted the ceremony in 1984. The full list of performers were announced on April 5, 2021, which included a record four Black artists.

Due to the COVID-19 pandemic, the show followed a similar format to the 55th ceremony, utilizing several locations and including a mix of live and pre-recorded performances. As with the 55th ceremony, presentations took place at the Grand Ole Opry House, Ryman Auditorium, and the Bluebird Café, while performances were also held at The Station Inn, Lower Broadway, and the Cumberland River.  Unlike the previous ceremony, a limited number of health care workers were also invited to attend the components of the ceremony at the Grand Ole Opry House and Ryman Auditorium, seated on the balconies (while the main floors were used to seat rotating groups of nominees).

On February 3, 2021, the ACM announced that Morgan Wallen would be ineligible to receive nominations or be involved with the ceremony, amid criticism of Wallen over a video that depicted him using a racial slur. The ACM stated that it "does not condone or support intolerance or behavior that doesn't align with our commitment and dedication to diversity and inclusion."

Winners and nominees 
Winners are shown in bold.

Performances
On April 15, 2021, the ACMs announced the official setlist for the ceremony. Luke Bryan was originally scheduled to perform at the ceremony but had to withdraw after testing positive for COVID-19. He was replaced by Lady A.

Presenters 
On April 16, 2021, the ACMs announced the presenters for the ceremony:

Reception 
The ceremony was generally well received. Noted for its "efforts to add diversity to its ranks" said the Rolling Stone, "the broadcast hit nearly all the right notes". The 56th ACM Awards gained 6.28 million viewers making it the lowest-rated and least watched ACM Awards to date, but still topping all of broadcast in the demo and drew larger audience than its network competitors combined.

References

Academy of Country Music Awards
Academy
Academy of Country Music Awards
2021 in Tennessee
Academy of Country Music Awards, 56